Vang is a municipality in Innlandet county, Norway. It is located in the traditional district of Valdres. The administrative centre of the municipality is the village of Vang i Valdres. Other villages in Vang include Hænsgardane, Nystuen, Øye, Ryfoss, and Tyinkrysset.

The  municipality is the 55th largest by area out of the 356 municipalities in Norway. Vang is the 298th most populous municipality in Norway with a population of 1,587.

General information 

On 1 January 1838, the prestegjeld of Vang was established as a civil municipality (see formannskapsdistrikt law). On 1 January 1882, a small area of Vang (population: 31) was transferred into the neighboring Øystre Slidre Municipality. The municipal boundaries have not changed since that time.

Name 
The municipality (originally the parish) is named after the old Vang farm since the first Vang Church was built here. The name is identical with the word  which means "field" or "meadow".

Coat of arms 
The coat of arms was granted on 26 June 1987. The municipal arms are based on historic descriptions and depictions of the personal arms the a local medieval nobleman Sigvat of Leirhol. He was named as one of the members of the delegation that followed King Håkon V Magnusson to Copenhagen in 1309. Later, he became the local governor of Valdres and Hallingdal (Vang is part of the Valdres region). He played a major role in the development of the region and the arms can be seen on different places, including in the local Vang Church.

Churches

The Church of Norway has four parishes within the municipality of Vang. It is part of the Valdres prosti (deanery) in the Diocese of Hamar.

History 

Vang, like the rest of Valdres, was originally populated by migrants from Vestlandet. In 1153, recognizing this, Cardinal Breakspear included these valleys in the Diocese of Stavanger.

The ancient Vang Church was the site of a legal court (thing) held by King Haakon VI in 1368. Here, he settled a boundary dispute. The boundary stone which resulted stands to this day.

High up the slopes of Filefjell is the site of Nystuen, where travellers found refuge as they passed across the divide into Vestlandet. On the other side of the pass, Maristua was erected at the direction of Queen Margaret circa 1390. Although Nystuen is first mentioned in 1627, it is undoubtedly older. These refuges were maintained by the state until 1830.

Smeddalen (Smith's Valley) immediately to the west of Nystuen, was for centuries the site of the church of St. Thomas på Filefjell. The earliest reference to it is in 1615, but it was apparently a stave church, so would have been much older. According to F.N. Stagg "It was reconditioned (c. 1615)… the priest at Vang preached there once a year–on July 2nd… many sought cures for their ailments in the miraculous powers possessed by splinters from its timbers…" A market grew up near the church as a result of the 2 July service. "Horses were traded, races run, heavy drinking indulged in and many a fight ensued." Markets continued to be held near the church until the 19th century, but as a result of fighting and general unrest in connection with the market days the church was torn down in 1808. A new church was built on the site in 1971.

Government
All municipalities in Norway, including Vang, are responsible for primary education (through 10th grade), outpatient health services, senior citizen services, unemployment and other social services, zoning, economic development, and municipal roads.  The municipality is governed by a municipal council of elected representatives, which in turn elects a mayor.  The municipality falls under the Vestre Innlandet District Court and the Eidsivating Court of Appeal.

Municipal council
The municipal council  of Vang is made up of 17 representatives that are elected to four year terms.  The party breakdown of the council is as follows:

Mayor
The mayors of Vang (incomplete list):
1976–1995: Erling Øraker (Sp)
1996-2011: Knut Haalien (Sp)
2011–present: Vidar Eltun (Ap)

Geography 

Vang is bordered to the north by the municipalities of Lom and Vågå, to the east by Øystre Slidre, to the southeast by Vestre Slidre, to the south by Hemsedal (in Viken county), and to the west by Lærdal and Årdal (in Vestland county).

Vang is part of the Valdres region in central, southern Norway. This region is situated between the Gudbrandsdal and Hallingdal valleys.

Three-quarters of the region is above . About 13 percent of the municipality is covered by water, including Lakes Fleinsendin, Slettningen and Vangsmjøsa. The river Begna has its headwaters in the Filefjell area of Vang.

Attractions 
 The Vang stone
 The Ryfossen waterfall
 The Sputrefossen waterfall

Gallery

Trivia 
The Veblen and Bunde farmsteads were the homes of the parents of Thorstein Bunde Veblen, from where they emigrated a year before the birth of their son.

Notable people 
 Christopher Andreas Holmboe (1796 in Vang – 1882) a philologist, orientalist and numismatist
 Johannes Belsheim (1829 in Thorpegardane – 1909) a teacher, priest, translator and biographer
 Nils Nilsen Thune (1880 in Vang – 1950) a Norwegian jurist and civil servant
 Torstein Høverstad (1880 in Vang – 1959) an educator, teacher educator, school historian and government scholar

References

External links 

 Municipal fact sheet from Statistics Norway 
 Municipal site 

 
Municipalities of Innlandet
Valdres
1838 establishments in Norway
Populated places established in 1838